Photinus macdermotti, or Father Mac's firefly, is a species of firefly in the family Lampyridae. It is found in North America.

References

 Lloyd, James E. (1966). "Two cryptic new firefly species in the genus Photinus (Coleoptera: Lampyridae)". The Coleopterists Bulletin, vol. 20, no. 2, 43–46.
 Lloyd, James E. (1969). "Flashes, Behavior and Additional species of Nearctic Photinus Fireflies (Coleoptera: Lampyridae)". The Coleopterists Bulletin, vol. 23, no. 2, 29–41.

Further reading

 Arnett, R. H. Jr., M. C. Thomas, P. E. Skelley and J. H. Frank. (eds.). (21 June 2002). American Beetles, Volume II: Polyphaga: Scarabaeoidea through Curculionoidea. CRC Press LLC, Boca Raton, Florida .
 Arnett, Ross H. (2000). American Insects: A Handbook of the Insects of America North of Mexico. CRC Press.
 Richard E. White. (1983). Peterson Field Guides: Beetles. Houghton Mifflin Company.

Lampyridae
Bioluminescent insects